Warren Cariou is a Canadian writer and associate professor of English at the University of Manitoba.

Biography 

Cariou received a B.A. (Hons) from the University of Saskatchewan and an MA and PhD from the University of Toronto (1998). In 1999 he published a book of short stories, The Exalted Company of Roadside Martyrs, with Coteau Books. This was followed up in 2002 with his memoir Lake of the Prairies, which gained him a wider audience. It won the 2002 Drainie-Taylor Biography Prize and was shortlisted for the 2004 Charles Taylor Prize. In 2005 Cariou served on the jury for the prestigious Scotiabank Giller Prize.

Cariou was one of three featured authors in Coming Attractions '95, and has had short stories appear in Stag Line: Stories by Men and Due West, both published by Coteau Books. As well, his fiction was awarded a CBC Literary Competition Prize in 1991.

He grew up on a farm near Meadow Lake, Saskatchewan, a place he describes in Lake of the Prairies. He has worked as a construction labourer, a technical writer and a political advisor. He holds a Ph.D. in English from the University of Toronto and now teaches Aboriginal Literature at the University of Manitoba. He is currently working on a novel entitled Exhaust. Cariou is married to the poet and literature professor Alison Calder. Cariou is also the director of the Centre for Creative Writing and Oral Culture  and is also an activist for the Protection of Indigenous Oralities.

Honours
 2002 Drainie-Taylor Biography Prize
 2005 Greifswald Canadian Studies Fellow in Residence, University of Greifswald, Germany

Works
 with W'Daub Awae, Kateri Akiwenzie-Damm, Daniel Heath Justice, Lesley Belleau: Speaking True: A Kegedonce Press Anthology. Kegedonce, 2006 Book

Books 

 Exalted Company of Roadside Martyrs.
 Lake of the Prairies: A Story of Belonging. This book won the Drainie-Taylor Prize.

Films 

 Documentary: Overburden by Neil McArthur and Warren Cariou. Released 2009-01-03.
 Documentary: Land of Oil and Water by Neil McArthur and Warren Cariou. 2009-01-01.

Photography (Petrography) 

 In 2013 Cariou wrote and created documentaries Overburdened and Land of Oil and Water with Neil McArthur about the highly destructive production of tar sands impacting the Indigenous communities of Saskatchewan and Alberta. Cariou then decided to begin using the toxic material to create photographs he has named petrography.
 He began experimenting with the new medium with assistance from Dr. Dusan Stulik, a Senior Research Scientist at the Getty Conservation Institute.
 Cariou uses a specific medium of petroleum and sunlight in his photography “Petrography is literally petroleum-photography:  the creation of images through the interaction of sunlight and the heavy petroleum product known as bitumen, which is the main source of the vast supplies of oil in Canada’s Athabasca tar sands region”.

References 

Canadian literary critics
Canadian male short story writers
Living people
People from Meadow Lake, Saskatchewan
Canadian people of Breton descent
20th-century Canadian short story writers
21st-century Canadian short story writers
20th-century Canadian male writers
21st-century Canadian male writers
Canadian male non-fiction writers
Year of birth missing (living people)
20th-century First Nations writers
21st-century First Nations writers
First Nations academics
First Nations artists